Young's (Young & Co.'s Brewery Plc) is a British pub chain operating nearly 220 pubs.

The company was founded as a brewery in 1831 by Charles Young and Anthony Bainbridge when they purchased the Ram Brewery in Wandsworth. The company closed the Ram Brewery in 2006, and the brewing operation was transferred to a new company, Wells & Young's Brewing Company Ltd, which was a joint brewing venture with Charles Wells Brewery. Young's held 40% of the shares in the new company until the sale of its stake to Charles Wells was announced in August 2011. There is a rolling contract for Young's to take beers produced by Wells & Young's and now by Marston's after it took over the Eagle Brewery in Bedford, an operation now called Carlsberg Marston's Brewing Company. Until its closure in 2006, the company's Ram Brewery in Wandsworth was claimed to be Britain's oldest brewing site in continuous operation, with a history dating back to the 1550s when a Humphrey Langridge, "beer-brewer at Wandsworth", leased the Ram pub.

History

A Ram pub on Young's brewery site was recorded from a survey around 1550 which details the owner as Elizabeth Ridon, who leased out the premises. The first indication of brewing at the Ram are from 1576 when a Humphrey Langridge, "beer-brewer at Wandsworth" (then a village in Surrey), had his house broken into, and the thief was tried at the local assize court; this Humphrey Langridge is also recorded as being landlord of "the Rame" in 1581, and so it is surmised by Young's historian that Langridge would have been brewing at the Ram in 1576. The site of this inn is today once again the Ram Inn having been previously called The Brewery Tap then The Ram Brewery Shop & Visitors Centre.  Records from 1675 show that the brewery was run by the Draper family, and in the 18th century, the Trittons purchased the brewery.  It was purchased by Charles Allen Young and Anthony Fothergill Bainbridge in 1831.  Since then it has been associated with the Young family, and until 2006 the last chairman of Young & Co belonging to the Young's family was John Young, the great-great-grandson of the founder.

The brewery supplied Young's public houses, in London and the area to the south-west, which still number over 200.  It also sold to many other pubs and supermarkets.  Beer was also exported to many European countries, Canada, the United States and Japan. The company produced three regular and a series of seasonal and occasional cask ales, keg lagers, and several filtered and pasteurised bottled beers.  Young's also contract-brewed several beers for InBev, such as Courage Best and Mackeson Stout.

On 23 May 2006, the company issued a press release announcing that the Ram Brewery was to close and brewing was to be moved to the Eagle Brewery in Bedford, then owned by Charles Wells. Wells & Young's Brewing, with Charles Wells having a 60% stake, and Young & Co 40%, went into operation on 2 October 2006. Wells & Young's was then responsible for brewing, distributing and marketing Charles Wells's and Young & Co's brands at the jointly owned Eagle Brewery in Bedford. The company was operated at arm's length from both Young's and Charles Wells. However a combination of directors from both companies sat on the Wells & Young's Board.

Chairman John Young died on 17 September 2006, days before the closure of the brewery, whilst the final brew was being run at the Ram Brewery Wandsworth.  Beer from the last brew was served at his funeral on 29 September 2006.

Young & Co is still based in Wandsworth. Until June 2007 it was based at offices at the Ram Brewery, but after that it moved into its new head office, around the corner from the former brewery site.

On 9 August 2011, the company issued a press release announcing the sale of its stake in Wells & Young's Brewing Company Ltd to Charles Wells.

Ram Brewery

Young's claimed that the Ram Brewery was the oldest British brewery in continuous operation. At the time of its closure in 2006, the brewery was a mix of ancient and ultra-modern plant, including a steam engine which had been installed in 1835 and had been in regular use until the 1980s.

A number of animals were resident in the brewery, including a ram, a number of geese and about a dozen working draught horses, usually a shire horse. Until the closure of the brewery in 2006, the horses and drays were still used for local deliveries of beer to locations within a mile or two of the brewery.

The Ram Brewery officially closed at the end of the business day on Monday, 25 September 2006.  The brewery closing story was carried by BBC London news and as of 4 December 2008, the old Ram Brewery has been approved for redevelopment into a new shopping / business centre.

The new owner of the site, property company Minerva plc, has hired one of the former Young's brewers, John Hatch, as site manager. One of his jobs is to keep brewing going on the site via a 'nanobrewery' set up in the old Young's laboratory. Hatch's new Ram Brewery brews at least once a week in order to maintain the "oldest British brewery" claim.

In July 2013, the redevelopment of the site was announced, to provide new residential and commercial properties alongside shops, bars, restaurants and public open spaces. As part of the redevelopment, historic buildings on the site will be retained and restored; among other things they will house a new micro-brewery and a museum of brewing history (in which the coppers and beam engine will be displayed). The banks of the River Wandle, which flows through the site, will also be opened up to the public as part of the new development.

In November 2020 Sambrook's Brewery, formerly of Battersea took a 25 year lease on the site to build a new microbrewery, taproom, and planned museum. The brewery became operational in March 2021 and is now the main hub of Sambrook's brewing operation. The nano brewery is also still operational and the taproom was slated to be open by July 2021.

The Ram Brewery was home to the MasterChef kitchen between 2011 and 2014.

Wells & Young's

Wells & Young's Brewing, with Charles Wells having a 60% stake and Young & Co 40%, went into operation on 2 October 2006. Wells & Young's is now responsible for brewing, distributing and marketing Charles Wells's and Young & Co's brands at the Eagle Brewery in Bedford. In August 2011, Charles Wells purchased Young's stake in Wells and Young's. Following a full rebrand in early 2015, the company went back to its roots and now trades as Charles Wells once again, reuniting the different arms of the business under its founding name.

In May 2017, Charles Wells announced that it was selling the brewery and wine business to Marston's Brewery together with the Bombardier and McEwan's brands and rights to the Young's brands. It said it would set up a separate brewery in Bedford to brew Charles Wells-branded beers in two years' time. The former Wells Brewery was subsequently renamed the Eagle Brewery by Marston's and in 2019 Young's rebranded its Bitter and Special brands to London Original and London Special respectively.

References

Bibliography
 Helen Osborn, Inn and Around London. Surrey Fine Art Press. .
 Helen Osborn, Britain's Oldest Brewery: the story behind the success of Young's of Wandsworth, Young & Co, 1999, 
 John Young, Acting Up, Autobiography published by The Memoir Club Durham

External links
 Young & Co's website
 Wells and Young's Company website
 Photographic Documentation of the last year of Young's Brewing in Wandsworth

Pub chains
British companies established in 1831
Breweries in London
Companies based in the London Borough of Wandsworth
History of the London Borough of Wandsworth
Food and drink companies established in 1831
Pubs in London